Ben Mitchell Williamson (October 16, 1864June 23, 1941) was a Democratic U.S. Senator from Kentucky.

Born in Pike County, Kentucky, Williamson attended the rural schools of Kentucky and Bethany College in West Virginia. He engaged in the wholesale hardware business at Catlettsburg, Kentucky, from 1886 to 1924, and then at Ashland, Kentucky in 1924. He also engaged in banking and in coal mining. He was one of the founders of the Kentucky Crippled Children's Commission, serving as president from 1924 to 1941. He was also a member of the board of charities and correction for the State of Kentucky from 1929 to 1930, and the director of the International Society for Crippled Children.

Williamson was elected as a Democrat to the United States Senate on November 4, 1930, to fill the vacancy caused by the resignation of Frederic M. Sackett and his initial replacement by John M. Robsion. He served only from December 1, 1930, to March 3, 1931, and was not a candidate for election to a full term.

Afterwards Williamson resumed the wholesale hardware business at Ashland, with residence in Catlettsburg, Kentucky, and was interested financially in various other business enterprises. He died in Cincinnati, Ohio, and was interred in the Ashland Cemetery Mausoleum.

Sources
 
 

1864 births
1941 deaths
Democratic Party United States senators from Kentucky
Kentucky Democrats
Bethany College (West Virginia) alumni
People from Pike County, Kentucky
People from Catlettsburg, Kentucky